Les Ifs is a commune in the Seine-Maritime department in the Normandy region in northern France.

Geography 

Population

Places of interest 
 The church of St. Barthélemy, dating from the eighteenth century.

See also 
 Communes of the Seine-Maritime department

References 

Communes of Seine-Maritime